Son of the Pink Panther is a 1993 comedy film. It is the ninth and final installment of the original The Pink Panther film series starting from the 1963 film. Directed by Blake Edwards, it stars Roberto Benigni as Inspector Clouseau's illegitimate son. Also in this film are Panther regulars Herbert Lom, Burt Kwouk and Graham Stark and a star of the original 1963 film, Claudia Cardinale. It was the final film in the original Pink Panther film series (which had started with the original 1963 film), as well as the final film for both director Blake Edwards and composer Henry Mancini; Mancini died on June 14, 1994 and Edwards retired from film-making a year later in 1995.

Plot 

Princess Yasmin of Lugash (Debrah Farentino) is abducted in French territorial waters off the coast of Nice by terrorists led by a mercenary named Hans (Robert Davi) in order to force her father to abdicate and allow her disgraced stepmother's lover, a military general with terrorist ties to an unfriendly neighboring kingdom, to claim the throne. Police Commissioner Dreyfus (Herbert Lom) is tasked with solving the case of the kidnapped princess. While investigating her disappearance in the South of France, he has a run-in with the kidnappers, and a local gendarme, named Jacques Gambrelli (Roberto Benigni). Gambrelli opens the rear doors of the kidnapper's van and unknowingly spies the Princess who he believes is the driver's sister en route to the hospital.

Hans becomes aware that Gambrelli witnessed the Princess in the back of his van and sends his henchmen to kill Gambrelli as a routine precaution. Dreyfus follows Gambrelli to the hospital where he observes the bumbling Gambrelli's antics with stumbling around as well as getting his bicycle stuck in a wet cement sidewalk outside the hospital. When Hans' henchmen arrive and chase after Gambrelli on his bicycle, Dreyfus intervenes and saves the klutzy policeman. He then takes Gambrelli to his home where he lives with his mother Maria (Claudia Cardinale) whom Dreyfus recognizes as a suspect in a murder case 30 years ago. During the casual encounter with Maria, Dreyfus learns from her Gambrelli is in fact the illegitimate son of the late Inspector Jacques Clouseau. When Hans' men attempt to plant a bomb under the Gambrelli house, it leads to Dreyfus becoming injured instead and sent to the hospital.

While Maria decides to stay beside the injured Dreyfus at the hospital to see him recover, they both reveal Gambrelli's origins to him as the only known offspring of the late Inspector Clouseau. Gambrelli finally decides to set off to rescue Princess Yasmin and prove himself his father's true heir and legacy. Gambrelli recognizes one of Hans' henchmen at the hospital who is inquiring about a doctor for Hans who is injured after Yasmin had attempted to escape. Impersonating a doctor, Gambrelli gains access to Hans' hideout and clumsily attempts to treat the injured Hans. Jacques accidentally stabs himself in the cheek with a needle filled with Novocaine, and gets locked up with the princess.

Hans decides to move his safe house out of France and to Lugash, and sends his men to kill Gambrelli by placing him in a van and rolling it down a steep road off a cliff, but Gambrelli manages to escape. Seeking help, Gambrelli travels to Paris to look up Clouseau's old friends and soon meets his late father's former manservant Cato Fong (Burt Kwouk) who directs him to Inspector Clouseau's former costumer Professor Auguste Balls (Graham Stark) to assist them with making new disguises for themselves to travel to Lugash to rescue Princess Yasmin. Gambrelli and Cato fly to Lugash where they meet a government agent at a local restaurant to point them the location of Hans' new hideout.

While being followed by the Lugash Army, as well as Cato, Gambrelli ventures to a castle located outside the Lugash capital city where in a climatic gun battle, Gambrelli gains access to the castle with the assistance of the army and after confronting Hans and his henchmen, defeats them, with a little of Cato's help and rescues Princess Yasmin.

After returning to France, Gambrelli is promoted to detective and transfers to Paris' metro police force as a full Police Inspector. He attends the wedding of Maria and Dreyfus whom have gotten engaged during their time together while Dreyfus recuperated at the hospital. During the reception, Dreyfus is uncomfortably shocked when Gambrelli's twin sister Jacqueline Gambrelli (Nicoletta Braschi) appears and who turns out to be just a clumsy and dim-witted as her brother, as Maria tells Dreyfus that she in fact had twins from her one-time tryst with Inspector Clouseau.

The final scene has Inspector Gambrelli attending a ceremony in Lugash attended by King Haroak and Princess Yasmin who award him with a special medal for his rescue of Yasmin which is attended by Maria, Dreyfus, Cato, Prof. Balls and Jacqueline Gambrelli, where his clumsy antics disrupt the proceedings just like his father Inspector Clouseau's antics used to do in previous Pink Panther films. Gambrelli closes the film by saying "That felt good!" followed by the image of Gambrelli freezing as the animated Pink Panther walks across the still of Jacques, until an animated Gambrelli suddenly cuts away the head of live-action Gambrelli and pops out of the hole, dropping the head on the Panther's foot. Having been made a fool by Gambrelli once again, the enraged Panther chases him into fading blackness.

Cast 

 Roberto Benigni as Gendarme Jacques Gambrelli
 Herbert Lom as Chief Inspector Charles Dreyfus
 Claudia Cardinale as Maria
 Debrah Farentino as Princess Yasmin
 Jennifer Edwards as Yussa
 Robert Davi as Hans Zarba
 Mark Schneider as Arnon
 Burt Kwouk as Cato Fong
 Mike Starr as Hanif
 Kenny Spalding as Garth
 Anton Rodgers as Chief Lazar
 Graham Stark as Professor Auguste Balls
 Oliver Cotton as King Haroak
 Shabana Azmi as Queen
 Aharon Ipalé as Gen. Jaffar
 Dermot Crowley as Francois Duval
 Liz Smith as Marta Balls
 Nicoletta Braschi as Jaqueline Gambrelli

Note: Claudia Cardinale played the Princess in the original Pink Panther film. Here she returns as Maria Gambrelli, the part originally played by Elke Sommer in A Shot in the Dark.

Production 

This was the first Pink Panther film in a decade, following two unsuccessful attempts to continue the series following the death of Peter Sellers, who originated the character of Clouseau. Considered a relaunch of the series, the plan was for Roberto Benigni—a popular Italian comedian who had yet to be discovered in America—to continue on where Sellers had left off. However, Benigni was not Edwards' first choice for the role. Kevin Kline was attached for a while. He was a fan of the series and loved Edwards' work but decided after reading the script that the project just wouldn't work. Kline and Edwards were to work together on a project called Luck (not an Edwards script) that William Morris packaged as a replacement project for the duo, but after this film flopped the project fizzled. Kline would also later play Dreyfus in the 2006 remake, and was initially considered for the part of Clouseau.

Rowan Atkinson was also offered the part, but declined (his star having risen considerably in the ensuing decade since Curse of the Pink Panther was offered to him). Atkinson loved Sellers' work and the Panther films, but was sure no one could replace Sellers. Gérard Depardieu was the next casting choice for Clouseau's son and was announced in the trades. When Giancarlo Parretti took control of Metro-Goldwyn-Mayer, MGM-Pathé Communications withdrew financing from the project and Edwards sued the studio in the Los Angeles County Superior Court. When Alan Ladd, Jr. came aboard, MGM settled out of court with Edwards. Ladd greenlit the film but Depardieu was now doing Ridley Scott's 1492: Conquest of Paradise and was no longer available. After the controversy over his rape remarks to an American journalist, MGM was also having second thoughts about Depardieu's suitability for a family-friendly comedy series.

Edwards then wanted Roberto Benigni after viewing Down by Law and Johnny Stecchino. While Benigni deliberated over the script, Tim Curry was kept in the wings as a potential back-up. Bronson Pinchot wanted the role, but MGM passed (probably because Blame it on the Bellboy tanked). There is early concept art for the theatrical poster showing Curry's moustachioed, frizzy-haired Gambrelli in cartoon form (in the baby carriage or pram that Benigni's cartoon visage would inherit). Curry also talked to the press about his desire for the role.

Securing Benigni in late 1991 found the film much-needed third party financing from Aurelio De Laurentiis (Dino's nephew). The film's budget of $28 million came partly from MGM (then under Alan Ladd Jr.) and with $13.8 million from Aurelio De Laurentiis' company, Filmauro. Filming started 8 June 1992 in Saint-Paul-de-Vence and production finished 4 months later, taking place in Pinewood Studios and the country of Jordan. During the film's final battle, the soldiers were played by real-life Jordanian Special Operation Forces paratroopers. Kroyer Films made the animated Pink Panther character and the animated persona of Clouseau Jr. in a live action sequence for the intro. The opening Pink Panther sequence cost an estimated $1 million.

Soundtrack 
Perhaps appropriately, this was the final film scored by Henry Mancini (he makes a cameo appearance of himself in the opening titles, giving his baton to the Panther who conducts the film's variation of the Theme). The soundtrack album was released by Milan Records.

 The Pink Panther Theme - arranged and performed by Bobby McFerrin (3:10)
 Son of the Pink Panther (1:33)
 The Snatch (2:22)
 God Bless Clouseau - music by Henry Mancini, lyrics by Leslie Bricusse (2:01)
 Samba de Jacques (2:24)
 The Gambrelli Theme (2:23)
 The Bike Chase (1:52)
 The Dreamy Princess (3:58)
 Riot at Omar's (2:40)
 Mama and Dreyfus (1:43)
 Rendez-vous with Cato (1:53)
 The King's Palace (1:47)
 The Showdown (3:31)
 The Pink Panther Theme (tenor sax solo: Phil Todd) (4:18)

Reception 
Son of the Pink Panther failed to generate critical or commercial success. The Radio Times Guide to Films gave the film only 1 star out of 5. On review aggregator Rotten Tomatoes, the film has an approval rating of 6% based on 34 reviews, with an average score of 3.40/10. The website's consensus reads, "Roberto Benigni is an undeniably gifted physical comic, but [the film] betrays his energetic efforts with a painfully unfunny script". On Metacritic, the film has a score of 33 out of 100 based on 19 critics, indicating "generally unfavorable reviews". Audiences surveyed by CinemaScore gave the film a grade of "C+" on scale of A+ to F. Benigni's harsh performance in the film earned him a Razzie Award nomination for Worst New Star. 

In its release in the United States and Canada it only grossed $2.4 million. However, the film was a top hit in Italy with a gross of $18 million and becoming the highest-grossing Italian blockbuster ever, despite tanking atrociously everywhere else.

Before the film's release, Adams confirmed that he and MGM planned to release more sequels to the film with Benigni reprising his role as Gambrelli. These were cancelled due to the film's poor reception. In 1996, MGM approached Robin Williams and Jim Carrey about the series. MGM would cut a deal for a reboot with Edwards (allowing the film to proceed without his participation) in 1997. The series was rebooted in 2006 with the release of The Pink Panther starring Steve Martin as Inspector Jacques Clouseau and Kevin Kline (previously considered for the role of Clouseau) as Charles Dreyfus. The Pink Panther 2 saw Kline's Dreyfus replaced by John Cleese.

This is the last film of the original iteration of the Pink Panther franchise. This was the last film to be directed by Edwards, who also co-wrote and produced all the previous Pink Panther films except for Inspector Clouseau. It is also the last film to be scored by Henry Mancini.

References

External links 
 
 
 

1993 films
American sequel films
1990s English-language films
Italian comedy films
Italian sequel films
Films scored by Henry Mancini
Films directed by Blake Edwards
Films with live action and animation
The Pink Panther films
1990s police comedy films
Metro-Goldwyn-Mayer films
United Artists films
Films with screenplays by Blake Edwards
1993 comedy films
Films shot in France
Films shot at Pinewood Studios
Films shot in Jordan
American films with live action and animation
1990s American films
1990s British films